Epidius is a genus of crab spiders that was first described by Tamerlan Thorell in 1877. It is a senior synonym of Pothaeus.

Species
 it contains fifteen species and one subspecies, found in Africa and Asia:
Epidius armatus (Thorell, 1895) – India, Myanmar, Laos, China
Epidius binotatus Simon, 1897 – West Africa, Congo
Epidius b. guineensis Millot, 1942 – Guinea
Epidius coloratus Benjamin, 2017 – Malaysia (Borneo), Brunei
Epidius denisi Lessert, 1943 – Congo
Epidius elongatus Benjamin, 2017 – Thailand
Epidius floreni Benjamin, 2017 – Malaysia (Borneo)
Epidius gongi (Song & Kim, 1992) – China
Epidius longimanus Benjamin, 2017 – India
Epidius longipalpis Thorell, 1877 (type) – India, Sri Lanka, Indonesia (Java, Sumatra, Seram, Sulawesi)
Epidius lyriger Simon, 1897 – Philippines
Epidius mahavira Benjamin, 2017 – India
Epidius pallidus (Thorell, 1890) – Indonesia (Sumatra)
Epidius parvati Benjamin, 2000 – Sri Lanka, India
Epidius rubropictus Simon, 1909 – China, Vietnam, Indonesia (Sumatra)
Epidius typicus (Bösenberg & Strand, 1906) – Japan

Formerly included:
E. bipunctatus (Thorell, 1891) (Transferred to Mastira)
E. brevipalpus Simon, 1903 (Transferred to Pharta)
E. gongi (Song & Kim, 1992) (Transferred to Epidius)
E. kalawitanus (Barrion & Litsinger, 1995) (Transferred to Cebrenninus)
E. zhengi (Ono & Song, 1986) (Transferred to Pharta)

See also
 List of Thomisidae species

References

Further reading

Thomisidae
Thomisidae genera
Spiders of Africa
Spiders of Asia
Taxa named by Tamerlan Thorell